Puyuhuapi Airport,  is an airport  south of Puyuhuapi, a small town at the head of a fjord in the Aysén Region of Chile. The airport is on land that projects into the fjord.

See also

Transport in Chile
List of airports in Chile

References

External links
OpenStreetMap - Puyuhuapi
OurAirports - Puyuhuapi
FallingRain - Puyuhuapi Airport

Airports in Chile
Airports in Aysén Region